The 19th annual Webby Awards for 2015 was held at Cipriani Wall Street in New York City on May 19, 2015, which was hosted by comedian and actor Hannibal Buress. The awards ceremony was streamed live at the Webby Awards webpage. Judges from the International Academy of Digital Arts and Sciences picked the over one hundred winners, which may or may not match the people's choice.

The Webby for Lifetime Achievement was awarded to Wired magazine co-founders Louis Rossetto and Jane Metcalfe for shaping how the world thinks about technology.

Nominees and winners

(from http://winners.webbyawards.com/2015)

References
Winners and nominees are generally named according to the organization or website winning the award, although the recipient is, technically, the web design firm or internal department that created the winning site and in the case of corporate websites, the designer's client.  Web links are provided for informational purposes, both in the most recently available archive.org version before the awards ceremony and, where available, the current website.  Many older websites no longer exist, are redirected, or have been substantially redesigned.

External links
Official site

2015
2015 awards in the United States
2015 in New York City
May 2015 events in the United States
2015 in Internet culture